Kim Kirchen  (born 3 July 1978 in Luxembourg City) is a Luxembourgian former road racing cyclist. He is the son of cyclist Erny Kirchen and the great-nephew of cyclist Jeng Kirchen.

Career
Kirchen signed as a professional cyclist in 2000 with De Nardi-Pasta Montegrappa, and went on to join  in 2001.  For the 2006 cycling season, he joined the  following the demise of the Fassa Bortolo team.

His first recorded race was in Dommeldange in 1999, and he had to wait until 2000 for his first professional victory when he won the Piva Col trophy.  Kirchen was named the Luxembourgian Sportsman of the Year in 2000, 2003, 2004, 2005, 2007 and 2008, surpassing the achievement of fellow cyclist Charly Gaul and putting him fourth in the all-time stakes.

In July 2008 he showed good form during the Tour de France, placing 7th in the general classification and wearing the yellow jersey for a total of four stages.

He suffered a suspected heart attack during the 2010 Tour de Suisse, in June 2010. He did not race in 2011 because of the heart condition and later retired from the sport.

Since 2011, Kirchen co-commentates all cycling races broadcast on RTL Télé Lëtzebuerg, along with former Cofidis cyclist Tom Flammang.

Major results

1999
 1st  Road race, National Road Championahips
2001
 1st Stage 3 Tour de Luxembourg
2002
 1st  Overall Ronde van Nederland
 1st  Overall Tour de Berne
2003
 1st Paris–Brussels
 4th Overall Tour de Suisse
2004
 1st  Road race, National Road Championahips
 1st Stage Tour de Luxembourg
 6th Road race, Olympic Games
2005
 1st  Overall Tour de Pologne
1st  Points classification
1st Stage 7
 1st Gran Premio di Chiasso
 1st Trofeo Laigueglia
 1st Stage 4 Settimana Internazionale di Coppi e Bartali
 2nd La Flèche Wallonne
 2nd Coppa Placci
2006
 1st  Road race, National Road Championahips
 1st Prologue Tour de Luxembourg
2007
 2nd Overall Tour de Suisse
 2nd Overall Tirreno–Adriatico
 3rd Overall Tour de Pologne
 3rd Brabantse Pijl
 3rd Milano–Torino
 7th Overall Tour de France
1st Stage 15
2008
 1st  Time trial, National Road Championahips
 1st La Flèche Wallonne
 Tour of the Basque Country
1st Stages 2 & 4
 1st Stage 6 Tour de Suisse
 7th Overall Tour de France
1st Stage 4
Held  after Stages 6–9
Held  after Stages 6–7 & 9
2009
 1st  Time trial, National Road Championahips
 1st Stage 7 Tour de Suisse

Grand Tour general classification results timeline

References

External links

 VELOBIOS Rider profile
 Kim Kirchen.com, official website
 
 Palmares at CyclingBase (French)

1978 births
Living people
Luxembourgian male cyclists
Luxembourgian Tour de France stage winners
Cyclists at the 2004 Summer Olympics
Cyclists at the 2008 Summer Olympics
Olympic cyclists of Luxembourg
Sportspeople from Luxembourg City
Tour de Suisse stage winners